Fisher Branch is an unincorporated community recognized as a local urban district in the Rural Municipality of Fisher in the Canadian province of Manitoba. It is located on Highway 17 in the north Interlake Region of the province. Fisher Branch was originally named Wasoo, but later was changed to Fisher Branch because it was beside a branch of the Fisher River. The primary industry of Fisher Branch is agriculture.

Demographics 

Media 
CBWGT went on CBWT-1 on February 1, 1967 as part of the province-wide microwave system.

 CKYA-TV Channel 8 (CTV)

Climate

References

Designated places in Manitoba
Local urban districts in Manitoba